Monika Gibalová (born 1 May 1960 in Spišská Sobota) is a former Slovak politician. She served as a Member of the National Council in the caucus of the Christian Democratic Movement for three terms from 2006 to 2016.  

Before entering politics, Gibalová worked as a nurse. In 1997 she finished her studies of Catholic Theology at the Comenius University. In 2000 she received her PhD in Social Work from the University of Trnava.

References 

Living people
1960 births
Christian Democratic Movement politicians
Members of the National Council (Slovakia) 2006-2010
Members of the National Council (Slovakia) 2010-2012
Members of the National Council (Slovakia) 2012-2016
Female members of the National Council (Slovakia)
Comenius University alumni